Charles Center is a highrise apartment building located in Baltimore, Maryland. The building stands 385 feet/117 meters tall and contains 30 floors. The building was constructed in 1969 by developers Conklin + Rossant.

See also
List of tallest buildings in Baltimore

References

Buildings and structures completed in 1969
Downtown Baltimore
Residential skyscrapers in Baltimore
Apartment buildings in Baltimore